Lee Carroll Bollinger (born April 30, 1946) is an American lawyer and educator who is serving as the 19th and current president of Columbia University, where he is also the Seth Low Professor of the University and a faculty member of Columbia Law School. Formerly the president of the University of Michigan, he is a noted legal scholar of the First Amendment and freedom of speech. He was at the center of two notable United States Supreme Court cases regarding the use of affirmative action in admissions processes.

In July 2010, Bollinger was appointed chair of the Federal Reserve Bank of New York board of directors for 2011. Previously, he had served as deputy chair. In 2004, he was elected to the American Philosophical Society.

On April 14, 2022, Bollinger announced in an email to the Columbia student body that he will be retiring from his role as President effective June 30, 2023.

Life and career
Bollinger was born in Santa Rosa, California, the son of Patricia Mary and Lee C. Bollinger. He was raised there and in Baker City, Oregon. Bollinger spent a year (1963) as an exchange student in Brazil with AFS Intercultural Programs. He received his B.S. in political science (1968; Phi Beta Kappa) from the University of Oregon, where he became a brother of Theta Chi Fraternity, and his J.D. from Columbia Law School (1971). He served as a law clerk to Judge Wilfred Feinberg of the United States Court of Appeals for the Second Circuit (1971–1972) and Chief Justice Warren Burger of the Supreme Court of the United States (1972–1973). Bollinger went on to join the faculty of the University of Michigan Law School in 1973, becoming a full professor in 1979 and dean of the school in 1987. He was appointed provost of Dartmouth College in 1994 before returning to the University of Michigan in 1996 as president.

Bollinger assumed his current position as president of Columbia University in June 2002. On October 19, 2010, the Board of Trustees announced through a university-wide email that Bollinger had agreed to continue as president for at least the next five years.

Affirmative action cases
In 2003, after having served as president of the University of Michigan, Bollinger made headlines as the named defendant representing the University of Michigan in the Supreme Court cases Grutter v. Bollinger and Gratz v. Bollinger. In the Grutter case, the Court found by a 5–4 margin that the affirmative action policies of the University of Michigan Law School were constitutional. But at the same time, it found by a 6–3 margin in the Gratz case that the undergraduate admissions policies of Michigan were not narrowly tailored to a compelling interest in diversity and 20 predetermined points are awarded to underrepresented minorities, and thus that they violated the Equal Protection Clause of the Fourteenth Amendment.

In 2006, affirmative action in university admissions in the state of Michigan was banned by a ballot initiative known as the Michigan Civil Rights Initiative.

President of Columbia

As president (nicknamed "PrezBo" by students), Bollinger has attempted to expand the international scope of the University, taking frequent trips abroad and inviting world leaders to its campus. Bollinger has been criticized for taking a neutral public position on controversies regarding the Middle East Languages and Cultures (MEALAC) department and for placing the department in receivership. He has also been the subject of criticism for his role in advocating the expansion of the university into the Manhattanville neighborhood and the possible use of eminent domain to help it seize property there. The Bollinger administration's expansion plans have been criticized as fundamentally incompatible with the 197/a plan for development crafted by the community, and for failing to address the neighborhood's need to maintain affordable housing stock.

President Bollinger has lived in the Columbia President's House since February 2004, after the building underwent a $23 million renovation. In February 2022, the Columbia Spectator reported that he had purchased an Upper West Side apartment for $11.7 million. In 2008, his salary was $1.7 million. In 2013, Bollinger's total compensation was $4.6 million, making him the highest paid private college president in the United States. Bollinger's residence has been the site of demonstrations in which his high salary was criticized as an example of the university's "inequitable allocation of resources." In a January 2021 rally during a student tuition strike protesting the university's tuition rates, Young Democratic Socialists of America organizers cited as further evidence of alleged inequitable allocation of university resources the fact that Bollinger's salary had been frozen that year, while the Barnard College administration's salaries had been cut, including by 20 percent in the case of the Barnard College president, Sian Beilock.

In November 2006, Bollinger was elected to the Board of Directors of the Federal Reserve Bank in New York City, a term lasting for three years.

In January 2022, Columbia announced that economist Nemat "Minouche" Shafik, current president of the London School of Economics, would succeed him as president of the university.

World Leaders Forum

Columbia invited Iranian President Mahmoud Ahmadinejad to speak at the World Leaders Forum on September 24, 2007.  A number of local and national politicians denounced Columbia for hosting Ahmadinejad. Bollinger described the event as part of "Columbia's long-standing tradition of serving as a major forum for robust debate, especially on global issues." Bollinger released a statement outlining his introduction, explaining to the student body that the free speech afforded to Ahmadinejad was for the sake of the students and the faculty rather than for the benefit of Ahmadinejad himself, whom Bollinger referred to as "exhibiting all the signs of a petty and cruel dictator."  Bollinger was criticized by students at Columbia's School of International and Public Affairs, but praised by Bob Kerrey who said that Bollinger "turned what could have been an embarrassment for higher education into something quite positive."

On the media
On July 14, 2010, he wrote an article for The Wall Street Journal calling for the American government to subsidize its journalists.

Personal life
Bollinger is married to artist Jean Magnano Bollinger. They have two children and five grandchildren. Bollinger's family is Catholic; his daughter, Carey Jean Bollinger, and son, Lee Carroll Bollinger, married in Catholic ceremonies.

Books
In addition to his academic and administrative positions, Bollinger has written many articles and books on the subject of free speech.
The Tolerant Society: Freedom of Speech and Extremist Speech in America (Oxford University Press, 1986) 
Images of a Free Press (University of Chicago Press, 1991) 
Eternally Vigilant: Free Speech in the Modern Era (University Of Chicago Press, 2002) 
Uninhibited, Robust, and Wide-Open: A Free Press for a New Century (Oxford University Press, 2010) 
The Free Speech Century (Oxford University Press, 2018) 
Regardless of Frontiers: Global Freedom of Expression in a Troubled World (Columbia University Press, 2021) 
National Security, Leaks and Freedom of the Press: The Pentagon Papers Fifty Years On (Oxford University Press, 2021)

See also 
 List of law clerks of the Supreme Court of the United States (Chief Justice)

References

External links
Columbia University President's Office: Bollinger Biography
University of Michigan Law School: Bollinger Biography
University of Oregon article about Bollinger
Columbia Spectator's Eye Magazine profile, "Finding Bollinger," by Jacob Schneider and Joy Resmovits
 

"No, I Won’t Start Spying on My Foreign-Born Students" op-ed by Bollinger published in The Washington Post 

 
American expatriates in Brazil
Presidents of the University of Michigan
Fellows of Clare Hall, Cambridge
Alumni of Clare Hall, Cambridge
People from Santa Rosa, California
Law clerks of the Supreme Court of the United States
Columbia Law School alumni
Columbia University faculty
First Amendment scholars
University of Oregon alumni
Presidents of Columbia University
People from Baker City, Oregon
Living people
1946 births
Deans of University of Michigan Law School
Catholics from California
Catholics from Oregon
Members of the American Philosophical Society
Columbia Law School faculty